Big Tobacco is a name used to refer to the largest companies in the tobacco industry. According to the World Medical Journal, the five largest tobacco companies are: Philip Morris International, British American Tobacco, Imperial Brands, Japan Tobacco International, and China National Tobacco Company. These companies have substantial power economically, with revenues matching some small countries. These companies are well-known for lobbying governments, advocating for looser restrictions and lower taxes. 

These companies have garnered significant controversy for the product they produce and the tactics with which they sell and market them. Tobacco use is the leading cause of preventable death and disease in the United States. Despite a general decrease in cigarette use in the United States, there has been no change in the use of smokeless tobacco.

Some of the tactics utilized by these companies have been noted to be similar to that of other industries such as the oil, sugar, and cell phone industries.

These companies are controversial due to the negative health effects of the products they produce, and attempts to misinform on this topic. In the United States, the big five tobacco companies have worked together to conceal scientific evidence on the negative effects of tobacco. There is also a history of manipulating and destroying evidence.

The Framework Convention on Tobacco Control was designed by the World Health Assembly as an international legal approach to reducing the effect of tobacco on public health. However, its implementation has also been interfered with by these tobacco companies. Tobacco companies have also been known to foster relations with governments and communities to maintain loose regulations on tobacco products.

See also 
 Tobacco politics
 Tobacco Master Settlement Agreement
 Jeffrey Wigand
 Nicotine marketing
 "Big"
 Big business
 Big Media
 Big Oil
 Big Pharma
 Big Soda
 Big Tech

References 

Further reading
 
 

External links
 Big Tobacco Manufacturers
 Campaign for Tobacco-Free Kids
 TheTruth.com
 Master Settlement Agreement

Anti-corporate activism
Libertarian terms
Pejorative terms
Tobacco industry